In field theory, a simple extension is a field extension which is generated by the adjunction of a single element. Simple extensions are well understood and can be completely classified.

The primitive element theorem provides a characterization of the finite simple extensions.

Definition 
A field extension  is called a simple extension if there exists an element  in L with

There are two different sort of simple extensions.

In this case  is isomorphic to the field of rational functions 

Its degree equals the degree of the field extension, that is, the dimension of  viewed as a -vector space.

For example, every finite field is a simple extension of the prime field of the same characteristic. More precisely, if  is a prime number and  the field  of  elements is a simple extension of degree  of  This means that it is generated by an element  that is a root of an irreducible polynomial of degree . 

However, in the case of finite fields,  is normally not referred to as a primitive element, even though it fits the definition given above.
The reason is that in the case of finite fields, there is a competing definition of a primitive element. A primitive element (in this sense) is a generating element (since an integer power is a special case of a polynomial), but the converse is false.

In summary, the general definition of a simple extension requires that all elements of the field can be expressed as a polynomials in a single generator, which is also called a primitive element. In the case of finite fields, every extension is simple, and all nonzero elements are pure powers of single element that is also called a primitive element. To distinguish these meanings in the realm of finite fields, one uses generally the term "generator" for the first meaning, and one reserves "primitive element" for the second meaning. The terms of field primitive element for the first notion, and  group primitive element for the second one are sometimes used.

Structure of simple extensions 
If L is a simple extension of K generated by θ then it is the smallest field which contains both K and θ. This means that every element of L can be obtained from the elements of K and θ by finitely many field operations (addition, subtraction, multiplication and division).

Consider the polynomial ring K[X]. One of its main properties is that there exists a unique ring homomorphism 

Two cases may occur.

If  is injective, it may be extended to the field of fractions K(X) of K[X]. As we have supposed that L is generated by θ, this implies that  is an isomorphism from K(X) onto L. This implies that every element of L is equal to an irreducible fraction of polynomials in θ, and that two such irreducible fractions are equal if and only if one may pass from one to the other by multiplying the numerator and the denominator by the same non zero element of K.

If  is not injective, let p(X) be a generator of its kernel, which is thus the minimal polynomial of θ. This implies that p is an irreducible polynomial, and thus that the quotient ring  is a field. As L is generated by θ,  is surjective, and  induces an isomorphism from  onto L. This implies that every element of L is equal to a unique polynomial in θ, of degree lower than the degree of the extension.

Examples 
 C:R (generated by i)
 Q():Q (generated by ), more generally any number field (i.e., a finite extension of Q) is a simple extension Q(α) for some α.
 F(X):F (generated by X).

References

Field extensions